Jean Collard (11 May 1881 – 1951) was a Belgian sculptor. His work was part of the sculpture event in the art competition at the 1936 Summer Olympics.

References

1881 births
1951 deaths
20th-century Belgian sculptors
20th-century male artists
Olympic competitors in art competitions
Artists from Antwerp